The following list is a discography of production by Stevie J

1995

 Jodeci: "Fun 2 Nite", "S-More", from the album The Show, The After-Party, The Hotel

1996

 Soul For Real: "Where Do We Go", "Love You So" from the album For Life
 Horace Brown: "How Can We Stop", "I Want You Baby" from the album Horace Brown
 112: "112 Intro", "Pleasure and Pain", "Come See Me Remix", "Sexy You Interlude", "I Can't Believe", "Only You Remix", "I Will Be There", "In Love With You", "Why Does", "Throw It All Away", "Only You" from the album 112
 Faith Evans: "I Just Can't" from High School High Original Soundtrack
 Lil' Kim: "No Time" from the album Hard Core
 Mona Lisa: "Just Wanna Please You" (Stevie J. Version)
 Faith Evans: "Soon As I Get Home" from the album Faith
 SWV: "You're The One" (Bad Boy Remix)
 The Isley Brothers: "Floatin' On Your Love" (Bad Boy Remix), "Floatin' On Your Love"(Bad Boy Slow Remix)
 Babyface: "This Is for the Lover in You" (Puffy Combs Remix)
 Chantay Savage: "I Will Survive" (Puffy Combs Bad Boy Remix)
 Tevin Campbell: "You Don't Have To Worry" from the album Back to the World
 MC Lyte: "Cold Rock A Party" (Bad Boy Remix)
 New Edition and Missy Elliott: "You Don't Have to Worry (Vocal Version)"

1997

 Mariah Carey: "Breakdown", "Honey", "Babydoll" from the album Butterfly
 Puff Daddy and the Family: "No Way Out Intro", "Victory", "Been Around The World", "Is This The End", "Friend", "I'll Be Missing You", from the album No Way Out
 Simone Hines: "Yeah! Yeah! Yeah!" (Stevie J. Remix)
 Tasha Holiday: "Just The Way You Like It" from the album Just The Way You Like It
 Mase: "Love U So" from the album Harlem World
 Jay-Z: "Lucky Me" from the album In My Lifetime, Vol. 1 (Produced with Buckwild)
 Gina Thompson and Missy Elliott: "The Things You Do (Bad Boy Remix)" – Single
 KRS-One: "Step into a World / Rapture's Delight" (Bad Boy Remix)
 Puff Daddy and Faith Evans: "I'll Be Missing You" – single
 Sting & The Police: "Roxanne '97"
 Total: "Kissin' You/Oh Honey" (Remix)
 Cherrelle: "The Right Time"- single
 Boyz II Men: "Can't Let Her Go" from the album Evolution
 LL Cool J: "Don't Be Late, Don't Come Too Soon" from the album Phenomenon
 Frankie: "I Have Love" from the album My Heart Belongs To You (co-writer, guitarist)
The Notorious B.I.G.: “Notorious Thugs” from the album Life After Death

1998

 112: "So Much Love Interlude", "Crazy Over You", "Never Mind" from the album Room 112
 Simply Red: "The Air I Breathe" Single from the album Blue
 Deborah Cox: "September", "Love Is on the Way" from the album One Wish
 Jay-Z: "Ride or Die" from the album Vol. 2... Hard Knock Life
 Faith Evans: "Lately I" from the album Keep The Faith
 Tamia: "Falling For You" from the album Tamia
 Total: "If You Want Me", "What About Us?" (Bad Boy Remix) from the album Kima, Keisha, and Pam
 The Jacksons: "Want You Back" Remix from album Motown 40 Forever
 Brian McKnight: "You Should Be Mine (Don't Waste Your Time)" from the album Anytime
 7 Mile: "Just A Memory", "After" from the album 7 Mile

1999

 Mariah Carey: "I Still Believe" (Stevie J. Remix) from remixed single I Still Believe
 Tevin Campbell: "Another Way", "For Your Love", "My Love Ain't Blind", "Dandelion", "Losing All Control", "Siempre Estaras en Mi (Dandelion)" from the album Tevin Campbell
 Notorious B.I.G.: "Would You Die For Me" from the album Born Again
 Mariah Carey: "Theme From Mahogany (Do You Know Where You're Going To?)" from the #1's
 Dave Hollister: "My Favorite Girl" from the album Ghetto Hymns

2000s

2000
 Mariah Carey: "Honey", "I Still Believe" from the album #1's Import Bonus Tracks
2001
 112: "I Surrender," from the album Part III
 Mariah Carey: "Honey" and "I Still Believe," from the album Greatest Hits
 Tyrese & Heavy D: "Criminal Mind," from Blue Streak Original Soundtrack
 Eve: "You Had Me, You Lost Me" and "Let Me Blow Ya Mind," from the album Scorpion
2003
 Mariah Carey: "Honey", "Breakdown" from the album The Remixes.
 Mary J. Blige: "Love & Life Intro", "Love at First Sight", "Feel Like Making Love" from the album Love & Life
 112: "Intro/Medley", "It's Going Down Tonight", "Hot and Wet", "Right Here for You", "Knock You Down Interlude", "Know You Down", "Hot and Wet Remix", "Give It To Me" from the album Hot & Wet
 Beyoncé: "Summertime" (co-producer, writer) from the soundtrack of The Fighting Temptations
 Snoop Dogg and Loon: "Gangsta Shit" from Bad Boys 2 Soundtrack

2004
 Carl Thomas: "Work It Out", "A Promise" from the album Let's Talk About It
 Eightball and MJG: "Shot Off", "Trying To Get at You", "Baby Girl" from the album Living Legends
 New Edition: "Been So Long" from the album One Love

2005
 B5: "Dance For You", "Let It Be", "No More Games" from the album B5
 Black Rob: "Y'all Know Who Killed Him" from the album The Black Rob Report
 The Notorious B.I.G.: "Down For Whatever" from the album Duets: The Final Chapter
 Mary J Blige.: Be Without You The Breakthrough

2006
 Notorious B.I.G.: "Mo Money Mo Problems" from the album DUB Hop Tribute To Notorious B.I.G.

2007
 Notorious B.I.G.: "Notorious Thugs" from Greatest Hits

2008
 Cheri Dennis: "Freak" from the album In and Out of Love

2009
 Day26: Forever in a Day 
 "Notorious Thugs" from Notorious Soundtrack

2011
Bobby V: "Heaven (My Angel Part II)" (co-writing, co-production, guitar) from the album Fly on the Wall

2013
TGT: "Hurry" (co-writing) from the album Three Kings

2014
 Rick Ross: "Nobody" from the album Mastermind

2015
 Puff Daddy and the Family: "You Could Be My Lover" from the album MMM (Money Making Mitch)

2017
 Faith Evans: "A Billion", "Legacy", "I Got Married (Interlude)", "We Just Clicked (Interlude)", "The Baddest (Interlude)", "It Was Worth It" from the album The King & I

2019
 Summer Walker: "Nobody Else" from the album Over It

References

Production discographies